On the Poverty of Student Life: A Consideration of Its Economic, Political, Sexual, Psychological and Notably Intellectual Aspects and of a Few Ways to Cure it is a pamphlet first published by students of the University of Strasbourg and the Situationist International (SI) in 1966. Attacking the subservience of university students and the strategies of student radicals, it caused significant uproar, led to the dissemination of Situationist ideas, and precipitated the events of May 1968 in France.

Background and publication 
Taking advantage of the apathy of their colleagues, five "Pro-situs", Situationist-influenced students had been elected to the University of Strasbourg's students' union in November 1966 and began scandalising the authorities. Their first action was to form an "anarchist appreciation society" called The Society for the Rehabilitation for Karl Marx and Ravachol; next they appropriated union funds to flypost "Return of the Durruti Column", André Bertrand's détourned comic strip. They then invited the Situationists to contribute a critique of the University of Strasbourg, and On the Poverty of Student Life, written by Tunisian Situationist Mustapha/Omar Khayati was the result.

The students promptly proceeded to print 10,000 copies of the pamphlet using university funds and distributed them during a ceremony marking the beginning of the academic year. This provoked an immediate outcry in the local, national and international media. The students responsible were expelled and the student union closed under court order. The scandal significantly raised the profile of the SI and led them to reappraise the revolutionary potential of academia, reversing their previous disillusionment to take seats on the Occupation Committee of the Sorbonne during May 1968. On the Poverty of Student Life was a key text for the French and German students who rebelled in 1968.

Content and reception 

The text displayed an advanced understanding of Situationist concepts and tactics. It provoked the students of the university by confronting them with their subservience to the ideological conditions imposed upon them by the state, family and the university system. The pamphlet alleged that the students fled from this reality to take refuge in miserabilism and bohemianism. It also criticised radical student collectives including the Provos (Netherlands), Committee of One Hundred (United Kingdom) and those of Berkeley, California (United States) for fighting specific issues such as nuclear arms, racism and censorship rather than the system at large, praising only Spies for Peace.

The title of the pamphlet induced fury in the Parisian cafés in the Spring of 1967. The pamphlet was described by a local newspaper shortly after its release as "the first concrete manifestation of a revolt aiming quite openly at the destruction of society". Critic Greil Marcus characterised the pamphlet as a polemic in his history of 20th century avant-garde art movements Lipstick Traces (1990).

See also
Report on the Construction of Situations
Port Huron Statement
Karl Marx' The Poverty of Philosophy (1847)

References

External links 
On the Poverty of Student Life at Nothingness.org

1966 essays
1966 in politics
Pamphlets
Situationist writings
Literature critical of work and the work ethic
University of Strasbourg